Ethiopian Coffee Sport Club (Amharic: የኢትዮጵያ ቡና ስፖርት ክለብ), otherwise known as Ethiopian Buna, is a professional Ethiopian football club based in Addis Ababa.

They are a member of the Ethiopian Football Federation and play in the top division of Ethiopian Football, the Ethiopian Premier League. Their home stadium is Addis Ababa Stadium. Along with rivals Saint George, it boasts one of the largest fan bases in Ethiopia.

History

Foundation (1976-1983) 
Ethiopian Coffee Sport Club has its origins in 1976, when the employees of Kefa Coffee Processing decided to establish a football club. After gathering the required number of players, the club was registered as Coffee Board Sport Club on the kebele level in order to take part in local tournaments. The club then moved to playing in the AEWA Factory workers Association level, the third division of Ethiopian football at the time. Funded largely by the Kefa factory workers at the time, the club offered its players employment at the factory as an incentive to keep them at the club. As a result, players would work the morning shift at the factory and then play football in the evenings. Thus, the first official name of the club became, "Yenegat Kokebe" (Morning Star) in reference to early raising factory workers who were also part-time footballers.

The clubs second name was "Yebuna Gebeya (Coffee Market) Sport Club" .The club amassed an impressive four trophies and one fair play award during its first 6 years.

Restructure (1983-1997) 
In 1984, the Addis Abeba Sports council was created in an effort to reorganize clubs in the city. As a result, the club officially changed its name to Ethiopian Coffee Sports Club under the management of the National Coffee Trading Corporation, then a government enterprise. For the next ten years the club would stagnate in the second division of Ethiopian football.

In 1994, with better financial backing, the club was able to sign top talents like Million Begashaw from Maritime and Mengistu Bogale from Berta S.C. These new signings helped the club earn promotion to the first division by virtue of winning the second division. In 1995, the club was restructured with financial support coming from the Ethiopian coffee exporters and by its steadily growing supporters.

First league title (1997-2010) 
The club won the first division title for the first time in its history in the 1996-97 season.By virtue of winning their first title, the club represented Ethiopia in the 1998 CAF Champions League. That same year, Aseged Tesfaye became the first player In CAF Champions League history to score five goals in a single match against St. Michel United FC (Seychelles) in an 8–2 preliminary round win. Tesfaye's record still holds to date.

Return to glory (2010-2013) 
Ethiopian Coffee were triumphant in their 2010-11 campaign, winning the Ethiopian Premier League Title. The club had to defeat Muger Cement F.C. on the last match day to secure its first Premier league title (second top division title).

A new approach (2013-present) 
In a 2016 meeting with supporters, long time club chairman LT. Fekade Mamo stated the main priority of the club was not competing for a league title, but rather survival in the top division. At the start of the 2017–18 Season the team hired Serbian manager Kostadin Papic to a two-year contract. One month into his stay as manager, the club and Papic decided to mutually part ways after it was determined that his health condition wouldn't allow him to cope with the demands of the job. In December 2017 the club hired Frenchman Didier Gomes Da Rosa as their new manager, replacing Papic.

"Though until recently considered arch rival to the nation's oldest, richest and most popular club, Saint George," noted a writer for the Addis Ababa Capital, "Coffee in the past couple of years faced high financial constraints hardly able to sign big name players. The result has been a decade existence never winning the premier league."

Colors and badge 
The Ethiopian Coffee logo has gone through some changes since the club's inception in the mid 70's. While the emphasis on the traditional coffee pot is present in previous logos, the vibrant maroon and gold colors in the current logo are what give the club its identity. The club's ultras are known to wave large strips of maroon and gold flags at matches.

Stadium 
Ethiopian Coffee has historically played at Yidnekachew Tessema Stadium, also known as Addis Ababa Stadium. The ground is shared with other football clubs based in Addis Ababa and is also used as an athletics venue for track and field competitions.

The ground has witness many occasions of violence in recent years between different sets of supporters including that of Ethiopian Coffee. Consequently, the Ethiopian Football Federation has handed down hefty monetary punishments and on some occasions banned supporters from stadiums for a certain number of matches.

The board of governors of Ethiopian Coffee have previously announced their intention to build their own ground in Addis Ababa.

Ownership and Finances

Sponsors 
In 2000, Ethiopian Coffee signed a sponsorship deal with a local car dealership, Ultimate Motors. In December 2008 The Ethiopia Commodity Exchange (ECX) bought a partial stake in the club. That same year, Meta Abo Brewery signed a three-year sponsorship contract, which was expected to help the struggling football club. In 2011, the club signed a shirt sponsorship deal with Habesha Brewery, their third ever sponsorship deal following worbek and meta Abo Brewery. In 2018, the club signed a deal making the Italian sportswear company Erreà its official kit manufacturer.

Academy 
The club has an Under 17 (U17) and Under 20 (U20) football team.

Support 
Ethiopian Coffee arguably have Ethiopia's largest football fan base. According to the team's official fan club, it boasts over 18,000 registered members from around the country. However, as a result clashes between these two sets of supporters, usually ultras, are very common especially when the two teams go head to head in the "Sheger Derby".

The club's supporters have been involved in some incidents of football hooliganism. A 2016 incident at Hawassa Stadium saw Ethiopian Coffee supporters clash with rival fans and police, resulting in supporters storming the pitch.

Honors

Domestic

League 
 First Division/Ethiopian Premier League: 2
1997, 2011
Ethiopian Run Away League: 1
2007

Cups 
 Ethiopian Cup: 5
1988, 1998, 2000, 2003, 2008
 Ethiopian Super Cup: 4
1997, 2000, 2008, 2010

 Addis Ababa City Cup: 3

2004, 2012, 2018

African 
 CAF Champions League: 2 appearances 
 1998 – Second Round
 2012 – First Round

 CAF Confederations Cup: 2 appearances 
 2004 – Preliminary Round
 2022 - First Round

 CAF Cup Winners' Cup: 3 appearances
1999 – First Round
2000 – Second Round
2001 – Second round

Players

First-team squad
As of 3 January 2021

Former players 
Further Information: List of Ethiopian Coffee S.C. players

Club Officials 
President:  Aleka Fekade Mamo

CEO:  Beyan Hussein

Coaching staff 
As of 12 March 2021

 Team Leader:  Zerihun Girma
 Manager/Head Coach:  Kassaye Arage
 First Assistant Coach:  Gebrekidane Negash
 Second Assistant Coach:  Zelalem Tsegaye
First-team goalkeeping coach:  Tsegazab Asegedom
Team Doctor:  Solomon Hailemariam

Former Managers 
 Seyoum Abate
 Wubetu Abate
 Abraham Teklehimanot
 Kifle Boltena
 Anwar Yassin
 Paulos Getachew 
 Abrham Berhane
 Sisay Zeleke
 Paulos Getachew
 Tsegaye Kidanemariam
 Tilahun Mengesha
 Dragan Popadić (2015-2016)
 Nebojša Vučićević (2016–17)
 Kosta Papić (2017-2017)
 Didier Gomes Da Rosa (2017-2018)

Notes

External links
Official site
Latest Ethiopian Football News
Club logo
Official Site

Football clubs in Ethiopia
Football clubs in Addis Ababa
Association football clubs established in 1976
1976 establishments in Ethiopia
Works association football clubs in Ethiopia